Himadri may refer to:
 Great Himalayas, one of the ranges of the Himalayas
 Himadri (research station), Indian research station in the Arctic

See also 
HIMADRI, the Himalayan Alpine Dynamics Research Initiative